Arthrobacter tumbae is a bacterium species from the genus of Arthrobacter which has been isolated from a biofilm which covered the Servilia tomb in the Roman necropolis of Carmona in Carmona, Spain.

References

Further reading

External links
Type strain of Arthrobacter tumbae at BacDive -  the Bacterial Diversity Metadatabase

Bacteria described in 2005
Micrococcaceae